The Arbitration Act 2005 is a Malaysian law which was enacted to reform the law relating to domestic arbitration, provide for international arbitration, the recognition and enforcement of awards, and for related matters.

Structure
The Arbitration Act 2005, in its current form (1 July 2011), consists of 4 Parts containing 51 sections and no schedule (including 1 amendment).
 Part I: Preliminary
 Part II: Arbitration
 Chapter 1: General Provisions
 Chapter 2: Arbitration Agreement
 Chapter 3: Composition of Arbitrators
 Chapter 4: Jurisdiction of Arbitral Tribunal
 Chapter 5: Conduct of Arbitral Proceedings
 Chapter 6: Making of Award and Termination of Proceedings
 Chapter 7: Recourse Against Award
 Chapter 8: Recognition and Enforcement of Awards
 Part III: Additional Provisions Relating to Arbitration
 Part IV: Miscellaneous

References

External links
 Arbitration Act 2005 

2005 in Malaysian law
Malaysian federal legislation
Arbitration law